Jerome Don Pasquall (September 20, 1902 – October 18, 1971) was an American jazz reed player.

Early life 
Pasquall was born in Fulton, Kentucky, and grew up in St. Louis. As a child, he played the mellophone in brass bands. He served in the United States Army in 1918 in the 10th Cavalry Band, and picked up clarinet during this time.

Career 
Following his discharge, Pasquall played with Ed Allen in 1919 and then found work on riverboats playing with Charlie Creath and Fate Marable. He moved to Chicago to study at the American Conservatory, and played with Doc Cook's Dreamland Orchestra as a tenor saxophonist. He then departed for Boston, and attended the New England Conservatory of Music. In 1927 and 1928, he played with Fletcher Henderson.

Following this he returned to Chicago and led his own ensemble, in addition to playing with Freddie Keppard, Dave Peyton, Jabbo Smith (1931), Tiny Parham, Fess Williams, the 1934 Blackbirds tour of Europe, Eddie South, Henderson again in 1936, and Noble Sissle (1937–1944). After the mid-1940s, he did freelance work in New York, with Tony Ambrose among others, and gradually receded from active performance. He never led his own recording session.

References

1902 births
1971 deaths
American jazz clarinetists
American jazz saxophonists
American male saxophonists
20th-century American saxophonists
20th-century American male musicians
American male jazz musicians